The Five Freedoms outline five aspects of animal welfare under human control. They were developed in response to a 1965 UK Government report on livestock husbandry, and were formalised in 1979 press statement by the UK Farm Animal Welfare Council. The Five Freedoms have been adopted by professional groups including veterinarians, and organisations including the World Organisation for Animal Health, the Royal Society for the Prevention of Cruelty to Animals, and the American Society for the Prevention of Cruelty to Animals.

Current compact
The five freedoms as currently expressed are:
 Freedom from hunger or thirst by ready access to fresh water and a diet to maintain full health and vigour
 Freedom from discomfort by providing an appropriate environment including shelter and a comfortable resting area
 Freedom from pain, injury or disease by prevention or rapid diagnosis and treatment
 Freedom to express (most) normal behaviour by providing sufficient space, proper facilities and company of the animal's own kind
 Freedom from fear and distress by ensuring conditions and treatment which avoid mental suffering

History
In 1965, the UK government commissioned an investigation, led by Professor Roger Brambell, into the welfare of intensively farmed animals, partly in response to concerns raised in Ruth Harrison's 1964 book, Animal Machines. The Brambell Report stated "An animal should at least have sufficient freedom of movement to be able without difficulty, to turn round, groom Itself, get up, lie down and stretch its limbs". This short recommendation became known as Brambell's Five Freedoms.

As a result of the report, the Farm Animal Welfare Advisory Committee was created to monitor the livestock production sector.  In July 1979, this was replaced by the Farm Animal Welfare Council, and by the end of that year, the five freedoms had been codified into the recognisable list format.

References

Animal welfare
Animals and humans
1965 introductions
Law of the United Kingdom